Danny López Soto (1944 – August 16, 2011) was a legislator in Puerto Rico.

Born in Utuado in 1944 to Pablo López and Mariana Soto. His family moved to the Villa Palmeras neighborhood of San Juan in 1950.  After studying high school at Luis Llorens Torres and República de Perú High Schools, he obtained his undergraduate and law degrees from the University of Puerto Rico School of Law.  He married Merilyn Pujals in the mid-1960s.

A pro-statehood activist since an early age, in the 1960s he rebelled against the leadership of Statehood Republican Party of Puerto Rico president Miguel A. García Méndez and, in 1967, helped found the New Progressive Party or New Party for Progress (NPP), which would win the governorship and control of the Puerto Rico House of Representatives in 1968.  He served as a member of that legislative body from 1969 to 1976.  From 1977 to 1984 he served as a member of the Senate of Puerto Rico from 1977 to 1984.

López Soto died in San Juan on August 16, 2011 at 67 years of age after a long illness.

References 

1944 births
2011 deaths
People from Utuado, Puerto Rico
University of Puerto Rico alumni
Members of the Senate of Puerto Rico
New Progressive Party members of the House of Representatives of Puerto Rico